Yavanika is a 1982 Indian Malayalam-language mystery thriller film written and directed by K. G. George, and starring  Bharath Gopi, Mammootty,Nedumudi Venu, Jalaja and Thilakan in lead roles. The film is regarded as one of the finest mystery or investigative thrillers ever made in Malayalam cinema. The film explores backstage drama of a travelling drama group. The plot is structured around the search for an unpopular tabla player of the troupe who suddenly disappears. The movie makes use of the Rashomon Effect. The film received wide critical acclaim. Yavanika is one of George's most celebrated films, regarded by critics as a masterpiece of Malayalam cinema.

Plot 

Vakkachan is a popular theatre owner running his drama company known as "Bhavana theatres". He is the director of his dramas and is a critically acclaimed director and often surfaces as the best ones in the state drama awards (in the story).
The movie starts with a scene that the troupe departs for a stage show during that night at a distant place. All are on board but wait for Kollappally, a popular and award-winning performer of the troupe. On that rainy evening, Kollappalli arrives late (unusually) and gives excuses to Vakkachan for being late, and the bus departs.

On the way, they pick up Rohini, who plays the lead female role in the drama, from her home. Vakkachan enquires about Ayyappan, the tabalist of the troupe, with whom Rohini lives. The gloomy faced Rohini says she doesn't know where he is and that he hasn't returned home since last night. Varunan, the comedian of the troupe, suggests going to the nearest arrack parlour where Ayyappan, a drunkard by nature, might be sleeping by booze over last night. However, the team could not find him there either and they proceed to the stage with anticipation that Ayyapan might be joining directly there.

As the drama starts, Ayyappan hasn't turned up yet, but Vakkachan takes the risk of starting the show without the tabalist. The drama goes well without him and the team proceeds to a hotel midway to the following day's show. In the morning, Chellapan sends another Tabalist named Janardhanan as a replacement for Ayyappan. After two consecutive shows, the troupe returns and drops Rohini first at her home and finds that Ayyappan hasn't returned to his home either. So, actress Rajamma decides to stay with Rohini for the time being.

After a week, the troupe members realize that the "missing" of Ayyappan is mysterious and without any valid reason, despite his history of quarrelling and leaving the troupe in the past. Varunan advises Vakkachan to register a complaint at the local police station for the missing Ayyappan. The police file the case and put Jacob Eeraly a Circle Inspector in charge of the investigation.

Soon, Jacob Eeraly starts an inquiry. He interrogates the troupe members one by one. Some are of the opinion that Ayyappan might have left the troupe or is with other women as he had taken the ornaments of Rohini the day before he went missing. Police are left clueless except that (1) Ayyappan son's presence in the scene, a potential reprisal to Ayyappan, just before the mysterious disappearance, (2) the verbal arguments between Balagopalan and Ayyappan in the arrack parlour on the night he went missing, and (3) the evidence that Ayyappan has sold Rohini's ornaments to a jewellery store owner the evening before he went missing. After a month when people begin to forget about Ayyappan, his body is recovered from a paddy field. The case now has turned into a homicide. Jacob Eerally identifies a keychain with some keys from the spot where the body was found, with "J.K." on it. C.I. Jacob recognises that it must be the short name for Joseph Kollappally. He grabs Kollappally after a stage show and arrests him silently. Kollappaly confesses that he killed Ayyappan on the roadside when he met him that night, as a result of a quarrel and wrestling. He said he hid the body under the paddy field. Jacob Eeraly partially believes it, though some missing links such as the presence of a piece of broken glass that was used to stab the victim was found at Rohini's house instead of at the spot where Kollappally reported where he committed the crime.

The next day again the drama troupe waits for Kollappally not knowing that he was arrested. Police set a plot to identify the role of Rohini in the homicide. Kollappally was allowed to phone the troupe and give a message that he will come to the stage directly. The curtain raises and the show starts. Rohini appears nervous to find out where Kollappally was and why he is late. Kollappally tells her in secret at the back of the stage that he has been arrested by police for the murder of Ayyappan. Rohini's consciousness fades and she enters the stage in the middle of the drama and confesses to the audience with utter tension that it was not Kollappally, but she who committed the murder of Ayyappan. She explains to the police that Ayyappan took her ornaments, sold them and provoked Rohini that he will be capturing her sister also for pleasure and ruin her too as he did to her. This triggered her anger and she stabbed him to death. In desperation, Rohini had sought help from Kollappally, who always had empathy for her, for the tied-up life with Ayyappan against her will. Kollappaly helps her in hiding the body under the paddy field. While packing Ayyappan's body, a piece of the bottle was left behind in the house which Rohini throws out of the house and which was subsequently found by Jacob. Both Rohini and Kollapally are taken into custody by police.

Cast 
Bharath Gopi as Tabalist Ayyappan
Nedumudi Venu as Balagopalan
Jalaja as Rohini
Thilakan as Vakkachan
Mammootty as Police officer Jacob Eerally
Venu Nagavalli as Joseph Kollapally
Jagathi Sreekumar as Varunan
Vijayavani as Molly Jacob Eerally
Thodupuzha Vasanthi as Rajamma
Sreenivasan as Chellapan
Ashokan as Vishnu Ayyappan
Mohan Jose as Danny
Kuttyedathi Vilasini as Ammini

Production

Development 
About the film's development, K. G. George says: "I was staying in Madras those days when I got a call from Henry. He told me he was interested in making a Malayalam film with me and asked me if I had any subjects in hand. This led to a meeting at hotel Taj Connemara where I told him about two subjects. This included Adaminte Variyellu and Yavanika. Henry was keen about Yavanika and gave me the go ahead." George had the screenplay ready but wanted someone with theatre experience to help him with the dialogues. George first met K. T. Mohammed with this request. He agreed but for various reasons could not get to work on it. Since the shooting dates had to be postponed as the dialogues were not ready, George took it to S. L. Puram Sadanandan who agreed to do it.

Filming 
To play the Tabla player in the film, Gopi learnt the instrument. He believed that before facing the camera, an actor should know what he is going to perform. The entire shoot was in the suburbs of Vattiyoorkavu in Thiruvananthapuram. The theatre, the house to which Ayyappan brings Rohini, were all located nearby.

Release and reception 
The film was released in four theatres. For the first week the response was lukewarm, but later picked up and became both commercial and critical success. Yavanika released along with the Prem Nazir-starrer Ivanoru Simham but still it managed to surpass its box office collection. Film critic Kozhikodan included Yavanika on his list of the 10 best Malayalam movies of all time.  The film received rave reviews from discerning critics too. There was one critic who compared the narrative style of the film to Akira Kurosawa’s ‘Rashomon.’ There was another who included this film among the world’s best in the detective genre. “I’m not sure if the film had similarities with Rashomon. But on this count, I think it resembled Citizen Kane more, though I did not think about all this when I was doing this film,” says KG George. Premlal of The Cue felt that, "'Yavanika adhered to the hallmarks of mainstream cinema and opened the way for broad possibilities to embrace the theme and characters with complexity and approach them philosophically and psychologically."

Accolades 
Yavanika won three awards at Kerala State Film Awards (1982).

 Kerala State Film Award for Best Film (shared with Marmaram directed by Bharathan)
 Kerala State Film Award for Best Screenplay - S.L. Puram Sadanandan, K.G. George
 Kerala State Film Award for Second Best Actor - Thilakan

The film won one award at the Kerala Film Critics Association Awards (1982).

 Kerala Film Critics Association Award for Second Best Actor - Mammootty

Soundtrack 
The music was composed by M. B. Sreenivasan and the lyrics were written by O. N. V. Kurup and M. B. Sreenivasan.

References

External links 
 

1982 films
1980s crime films
1980s mystery films
1982 thriller films
1980s Malayalam-language films
Indian mystery thriller films
Films shot in Thiruvananthapuram
Films scored by M. B. Sreenivasan
Films directed by K. G. George